Xi'an Road Subdistrict is a township-level division in the east of the Shahekou District of Dalian, Liaoning, China.

Administration
There are 14 communities within the subdistrict.

Communities:
Tianxing Community
Yonglian Community
Minquan Community
Changjiang Community
Minxing Community
Zhicheng Community
Yongshun Community
Huanghe Community
Xingxin Community
Xingshe Community
Xingsheng Community
Ruyi Community
Yongji Community
Quanyong Community

See also
List of township-level divisions of Liaoning
Shahekou

References

External links
西安路街道党建网 

Dalian
Township-level divisions of Liaoning
Subdistricts of the People's Republic of China